Purely functional may refer to:

Computer science 
 Pure function, a function that does not have side effects
 Purely functional data structure, a persistent data structure that does not rely on mutable state
 Purely functional programming, a programming paradigm that does not rely on mutable state

Law 
 Functionality doctrine, in intellectual property law

See also 
 Referential transparency